South Downtown is a historic neighborhood of Downtown Atlanta, Georgia, United States. South Downtown is primarily home to city, county, state, and federal governmental offices, which prompted the city to adopt signage declaring the area "Government Walk." Although much of South Downtown is dominated by surface parking lots, the neighborhood was passed over during the redevelopment boom of the 1960s and 1970s that resulted in the demolition of much of Downtown's architecturally significant buildings. The result is myriad buildings from the 1950s and earlier that retain their historic structural integrity.

Geography
South Downtown is located north of I-20, east of Castleberry Hill, south of Five Points, and west of I-85. Underground Atlanta is the primary shopping and entertainment center near South Downtown and it, along with the railroad gulch ("The Gulch"), separates the district from Five Points and the Hotel District.

History

South Downtown was once a bustling shopping district. Whitehall Street, renamed Peachtree Street Southwest, was the principal shopping street of Atlanta from the 1850s until the mid-20th century. A source from 1854 reported that the street was "being built up with stores of brick", while Broad Street was the market district. The City of Atlanta historians refer to the area as the "Heart of Atlanta" commercial district.

In the late 19th and early 20th centuries, a cluster of department stores was located in the area. In the 1870s, the "Big Five" were Rich's, Chamberlain, Boyton, & Co., Ryan's; Keeley's; and Dougherty's; later, the J.M. High Company would join their leagues. By the 1930s, Rich's would come to dominate the South Downtown shopping district. In 1949, Whitehall was filled with five and dime stores, such as McCrory's, S. H. Kress, Woolworth's, and W. T. Grant.

As late as 1968 the northern end of Whitehall was still called a "bustling retail corridor". Today, Peachtree Street Southwest continues as a low-end shopping area with several of the older retail buildings converted into "malls": Metro Mall in the old McCrory's building and the Mall at 82 Peachtree, in the Rich's 1906 building. And landmark Miller's Rexall Drugs continues its trade in hoodoo and homeopathic remedies at Broad and Mitchell streets, as it has since 1965.

Located in South Downtown is Hotel Row, both a National Register and locally listed historic district consisting of one block of early 20th century commercial buildings, 3-4 stories high, located on Mitchell Street west of Forsyth Street. The building were originally hotels built to serve the needs of passengers from Terminal Station, opened in 1905 and demolished in 1971. The buildings are the most intact row of early 20th century commercial structures in the city in Atlanta's original business district. The decline of Hotel Row began in the 1920s due to the increased availability of automobile transportation and the construction of the Spring Street viaduct, which made getting to hotels in the northern part of the city easier.

Government facilities

South Downtown is home to the governmental facilities of the City of Atlanta, Fulton County, and the State of Georgia. South Downtown is also home to federal government offices. This concentration of governmental facilities influenced the city's decision to market the area as "Government Walk." A list of the most well known government buildings in this district are:
Atlanta City Hall
Georgia State Capitol
Fulton County Courthouse
 Martin Luther King Jr. Federal Building
 Sam Nunn Atlanta Federal Center
 Richard B. Russell Federal Building

To the east of Central Avenue, aside from the Georgia State Capitol, many State of Georgia offices are located in this district, such as the Georgia Department of Transportation (GDOT), Georgia Department of Agriculture, and the Georgia Supreme Court.

Transportation

MARTA provides public transportation to the district through the Garnett Transit Station, located on Peachtree Street, and Georgia State Station, located on Piedmont Avenue.

Many commuters from the southern suburbs who work in Downtown travel on South Downtown's streets when heading to work. Many streets in this district are one-way, similar to the other districts that make up Downtown.

Peachtree Street, south of the railroad gulch, has a multitude of stores along its stretch between Alabama Street and Martin Luther King Jr. Drive. It is the primary two way north-south street in this district.
 Trinity Avenue and Memorial Drive are the only two-way streets in South Downtown that run east and west. Trinity Avenue is signed as Georgia State Route (SR) 154 until it ends at Memorial Drive near Capitol Avenue at the eastern end of the South Downtown, where Memorial Drive becomes Georgia SR 154.
 Central Avenue is a primary northbound street through the district. It is the main route for commuters into Downtown from the southern suburbs. The Fulton County Justice Center is located at 185 Central Avenue SW.
 Pryor Street is a primary southbound street through the district. It is one of the routes out of Downtown when commuters head back to the southern and western suburbs. The Fulton County Courthouse is located at 136 Pryor Street SW and the Fulton County Government Center is located at 141 Pryor Street SW.

References

External links
 Thomas Wheatley, "South Downtown must be fixed for Atlanta to thrive", Creative Loafing, November 3, 2011

Buildings designated early commercial in the National Register of Historic Places
Neighborhoods in Atlanta
National Register of Historic Places in Atlanta
Buildings and structures on the National Register of Historic Places in Georgia (U.S. state)